Mehrkam Pars Tehran Football Club was an Iranian football club based in Tehran, Iran. They competed in the 2009-10 Azadegan League.

The club license was bought by the club Sanat Sari

Season-by-season
The table below chronicles the achievements of the Club in various competitions.

Football clubs in Iran
Association football clubs established in 2003
2003 establishments in Iran